Sabatier is the maker's mark used by several kitchen knife manufacturers—by itself it is not a registered brand name. The name Sabatier is considered to imply a high-quality knife produced by one of a number of manufacturers in the Thiers region of France using a full forging process; the knives of some of these manufacturers are highly regarded. However, the name "Sabatier" came into use before intellectual property laws and is not protected; knives legally bearing the name range from high-quality knives made in France to cheap mass-produced products of poor quality from France and other countries; a registered logo or full name, or both, such as "65 Sabatier Perrier", is necessary to establish origin and quality.

History

The name originated in Thiers, France, at the beginning of the 19th century. The area of Thiers has been associated with the cutlery industry since the 15th century. With the advent of the industrial age, manufacturers began to consolidate their crafts or trades by creating brand or trade marks.

In the early 19th century, two separate families began using the name Sabatier to market their knives: Jean Sabatier of Le Moutier (lower Thiers) and Philippe Sabatier of Bellevue (upper Thiers). The families are not known to be related except by name and craft. There is a dispute over who registered the trademark first, with each citing evidence. The Sabatiers of Le Moutier company survived in many incarnations until the brand was bought out by Cuisinox in 1979. The only surviving family is the Sabatiers of Bellevue, which is still at the same address and still owned by the descendants of the original founder, Philippe Sabatier. It continues to make the knives under the corporate name ETS Sabatier Aîné & Perrier.

Manufacturing process

Among the many Sabatier manufacturers in Thiers, France, most provide high quality cutlery using traditional forging techniques that were developed in the area in the early and mid-19th century. Most of these manufacturers use a "fully forged" technique and a hand shaping and sharpening process using local skilled labour.

Fully forged means that three of the four knife parts (blade, bolster, tang and handle) are forged from a single piece of steel. In this process, a single cylinder shaped steel billet is heated where the bolster will be, and squeezed from the ends to create a bulge. The entire piece is heated again and forged to the shape of the blade, bolster, and tang using forging dies in one operation. Afterward, a clipping tool is used to cut the forged piece to the rough shape of the knife. Finally, the handles are riveted on, and the final shaping and sharpening is done by hand. The alternative way to manufacture knives is stamping; forging has traditionally been considered superior, but from the late 20th century some knives of excellent quality have been produced by stamping.

Brand names

The use of the Sabatier name is an anomaly of "branding" because the name was used by many different companies before intellectual property or trademark laws were fully established in France. In order to distinguish between the various makers of Sabatier knives, manufacturers are required to include a second word or symbol along with "Sabatier". Over the years many marks have been registered. In 1979, after the sale of the Moutier Sabatier brands to Cuisinox, the various holders of the brands formed an association to protect the brand name.

 SABATIER frères
 K SABATIER
 SABATIER PERRIER
 65 SABATIER
 62 SABATIER
 France SABATIER Jeune K Garanti
 SABATIER Jeune Garanti with a bunch of grapes
 SABATIER Acier Fondu Garanti with a bunch of grapes
 France SABATIER Acier Fondu couronne K Garanti
 Véritable SABATIER France
 Professional SABATIER
 SABATIER Professional
 V SABATIER France
 V SABATIER Acier Fondu Garanti
 V SABATIER Extra Fin
 SABATIER 689 Couronné
 SABATIER Couronné
 SABATIER 589 Couronné
 SABATIER Trompette
 SABATIER Deg
 SABATIER****
 SabatieR
 SABATIER Trumpet France
 Sarry SABATIER
 Le vrai SABATIER
 Le seul SABATIER
 L’unique SABATIER 1ère qualité
 SABATIER with a stylised slicing disk
 SABATIER Lion
 SABATIER Diamant
 SABATIER Elephant

While there are many knife manufacturers using Sabatier as their brand, some Sabatier manufacturers are considered authentic, and some are not. Generally speaking, among connoisseurs of fine cutlery, only knives manufactured in Thiers from well-established manufacturers from the 19th century are considered "genuine" Sabatier knives.

Many other manufacturers, both in France and elsewhere, use the Sabatier name on their knives; however, they are usually mass-produced, and of poor quality. Neither words such as vrai or garanti, nor "Made in France", ensure a good knife.

Companies selling Sabatier knives

Sabatier brands have been sold by many companies over the years. The following list is an attempt to link the present day owners to the brands.

 ETS Sabatier Aîné & Perrier - Sabatier Aîné & Perrier claims to be the oldest Sabatier knife maker still in existence and operated by the descendants of Phillipe Sabatier of Bellevue, Thiers, France. The brand has been based in Thiers, the French cutlery trade capital, since the early 19th century. They have operated for more than 200 years and have sold under the brand name Sabatier-k since 1834, to distinguish themselves from the Sabatier of Le Moutier. The first references to the mark "K" can be found in the town archives, engraved on the Silver Tablet of Cutlers, dated 7 June 1813 under number 231. Eight generations of the Sabatier family of Bellevue have been involved in the business.
 Thiers Issard Sabatier - Thiers Issard Sabatier have manufactured the Sabatier Elephant knives in Thiers since 1958.
 Therias et L'Econome - Therias et L'Econome claim to have been manufacturing knives in Thiers since 1819. They sell Sabatier knives under the brand L'Unique Sabatier as well as Mexeur & Cie.  In 2015 it was sold to Guy Degrenne S.A.  Degrenne still sells Sabatier branded knives under their Ideal Forge label.
 Rousselon Frères - Owners of the Mexeur Lion Sabatier make of knives since 1991, manufactured in Thiers. They claim the make was officially registered in 1812.
 Sabatier Diamant - Manufacture the Sabatier Diamant brand in Thiers.
 Amefa Couzon Cuisinox and Richardson Sheffield - In December 2005 Dutch company Amefa bought France's second-largest cutlery company Couzon, the owner of Cuisinox. In 2007 Amefa purchased the British knife maker Richardson Sheffield. They own the Sabatier Trompette (trumpet) and V Sabatier ranges.

References

External links
 Sabatier K Knives website
 USA Sabatier K Knives website
 The Sabatier Brand

Kitchenware brands
Knife manufacturing companies
Kitchen knife brands